Kashuni may refer to:
 Kashuni, Armenia, a village in Syunik Province, Armenia
 Kashuni, Iran, a village in Hormozgan Province, Iran